Bachelor in Paradise: After Paradise (often referred to as just After Paradise) is an American television talk show that premiered on August 3, 2015, on ABC. The series is a spin-off of the reality series Bachelor in Paradise, making it one of the many spin-offs of The Bachelor, which both air on the same network.

Bachelor in Paradise: After Paradise is a live, weekly talk show that features cast of the series and celebrity fans discussing the most recent episodes of Bachelor in Paradise. The series also features questions from the audience, deleted scenes, outtakes and exclusive extra content. The talk show is hosted by Michelle Collins and co-hosted by Sean Lowe.

Development and production
In July 2015, Bachelor in Paradise: After Paradise was announced to begin airing immediately following Bachelor in Paradise. Also announced was Chris Harrison was set to host the show and Jenny Mollen as co-host. On April 19, 2016, it was announced that the series would return for a second season with the introduction of a new host, comedian and talk show host, Michelle Collins and co-host, the star from season 17 of The Bachelor, Sean Lowe. The show didn't return in 2017, due to the crammed filming time of Season 4 due to the production shutdown over sexual misconduct allegations, but ABC said that After Paradise could return in the future. However, it did not return in 2018.

Mike Fleiss, Michael Davies, Jen Patton and Elan Gale are recognized as the series' executive producers; it is produced by Next Entertainment, Warner Horizon Television and Embassy Row, and is distributed by Warner Bros.

Episodes

Season 1 (2015)

Season 2 (2016)

References

External links 

 

American Broadcasting Company original programming
Television series by Warner Horizon Television
2015 American television series debuts
2016 American television series endings
2010s American television talk shows
American television spin-offs
English-language television shows
Reality television spin-offs
Paradise: After Paradise